Jan Martykán (born 17 March 1983) is a Czech football player who currently plays for Srbice.

References

External links

1983 births
Living people
Czech footballers
Czech First League players
FK Ústí nad Labem players
1. FC Slovácko players
Association football midfielders